Maksym Kalenchuk (born 5 December 1989) is a Ukrainian professional footballer who plays as a midfielder for Akzhayik.

Honours
Akzhayik
 Kazakhstan Cup: runner-up: 2022

External links
 
 
 

1989 births
Living people
Footballers from Donetsk
Ukrainian footballers
Association football midfielders
Ukrainian expatriate footballers
Expatriate footballers in Belarus
Expatriate footballers in Kazakhstan
Ukrainian expatriate sportspeople in Belarus
Ukrainian Premier League players
Ukrainian First League players
Ukrainian Second League players
FC Tytan Donetsk players
FC Zirka Kropyvnytskyi players
FC Slavkhlib Slovyansk players
FC Konti Kostiantynivka players
USK Rubin Donetsk players
FC Stal Kamianske players
FC Oleksandriya players
NK Veres Rivne players
FC Lviv players
FC Rukh Lviv players
FC Vitebsk players
FC LNZ Cherkasy players
FC Akzhayik players